Odhikar is a Bangladesh-based human rights organization that was founded in October 1994. It is a member of the International Federation for Human Rights (FIDH). It has been publishing an annual activity report since 2003. Odhikar's work has been cited by Human Rights Watch in their 2011 World Report on Bangladesh. The goal for establishing Odhikar was to develop human rights alertness and observing violations in Bangladesh.

On November 11, 2018, the newspaper Janakantha published an article written by Bibhash Baroi which Odhikar called slanderous. In November 2018, the Election Commission in Bangladesh annulled Odhikar to be an observer on elections.

2013 Shapla Square protests
On 10 June 2013, Odhikar published a fact finding report on the 2013 Operation at Motijheel Shapla Chattar claiming 61 deaths, but refused to provide any names of the victims report, citing security concerns for the families of the victims.

References

Organizations established in 1994
Human rights in Bangladesh
Human rights organisations based in Bangladesh
Civil rights organizations
Violence against women in Bangladesh